Yu-3 or Yu 3may refer to:

Yu-3 torpedo, a Chinese torpedo
, an Imperial Japanese Army transport submarine of World War II